Celebrity DAT Com is a now-defunct showbiz talk show aired on IBC from May 22, 2003, to 2004.

History
Launched in 2003, after IBC was reformatted, with its new slogan New Face. New Attitude, one of the programs launched was Celebrity DAT Com. DAT stands for Dolly, Angelu, and TJ. The program was one of the reincarnation of IBC's past showbiz talk shows in evening slot like Seeing Stars with Joe Quirino and See True. It was aired every Thursdays at 9:30pm. This show gave the viewers with some interviews with the celebrities, movie and CD reviews, human interest stories, sports updates, and blind items.

Hosts
Dolly Ann Carvajal (2003–2004)
Angelu de Leon (2003–2004)
TJ Manotoc (2003–2004)

Segments
ICQ (Intimate and Confidential Questions)
Chatroom
Rant N' Rave
Inbox
Backstage Pass

See also
List of programs previously broadcast by Intercontinental Broadcasting Corporation

Philippine television talk shows
Intercontinental Broadcasting Corporation
Entertainment news shows in the Philippines
2003 Philippine television series debuts
2004 Philippine television series endings
Filipino-language television shows